Janani is a 2006 Indian Hindi language film starring Bhagyashree and Ayesha Jhulka.

Plot 
Rahul falls in love with Neha, whom he meets in college. However, when his mother discovers who Neha's parents are, things get complicated as Rahul and Neha find out that they may in fact be siblings. When Rahul parents oppose their wedding, Rahul insist on finding the real reason, and thinks because of Neha's status Rahul parents are opposing. The parents explain that Neha's mother was working in their toy factory and helped them in expanding their business, and he is her biological son.

Rahul gets very upset after discovering that Neha is his real sister, with whom he had sex the last night.
In the background they also show the full story of how Rahul was adopted by Urmila, and how the relationship between Urmila and Rahul's biological mother was spoiled, after death of Rahul's elder brother who was also called by the same name due to brain tumor. Although Urmila and her husband had helped Rahul parents financially and supported them with the treatment of elder Rahul, but he could not survive for longer and that was the main reason that Rahul's biological mother Akansha was not willing to surrender her second son who was also named Rahul.

Both Urmila and Akansha wanted the Rahul and Urmila's husband beg Akansha for the custody of Rahul.
When Neha talks to Rahul's biological mother she discovers that she was also adopted by Rahul's real mother and they are indeed not brother and sister, but it is too late, since Rahul has shot himself when they both rush to their home and he becomes injured, they both explain that Neha is not Rahul's real sister, and Rahul also survives and they show after a year they are happily married and they have their own son, and this way it is happy ending for every one and all the family members celebrate good moments and the movie ends with a song of Rahul and Neha in the rain and water.

Cast 
 Bhagyashree as Akanksha Tarun Awasthi, Child Rahul and Rahul's biological mother 
 Ayesha Jhulka as Urmila
 Mohnish Bahl as Raj
 Aman Verma as Tarun Awasthi, Child Rahul and Rahul's biological father
 Vineet Raina as Rahul Awasthi
 Sonica Handa as Neha Rahul Awasthi 
 Anjana Mumtaz as Mrs. Awasthi, Rahul's grandmother
 Hemant Choudhary
 Smith Seth as Child Rahul Awasthi

Reception
Taran Adarsh of Bollywood Hungama gave the film 1 star out of 5, writing ″Chander Behl's direction has its limitations due to a half-convincing script. Dialogues too seem straight out of yesteryear films. Musically [Nirmal Pawar], a mediocre score. JANANI has two powerful performances in the form of Bhagyashree and Mohnish Bahl. Both seasoned actors, they infuse life in their roles with solid portrayals. Ayesha Julka goes overboard at times. Aman Verma is passable. Vineet and Sonica are able in their debut film. On the whole, JANANI has nothing to lure the family audiences, its target audience. At the box-office, this one's a non-starter!″

References

External links 
 

2000s Hindi-language films
2006 films